Roleine Cecil "Rollie" Naylor (February 4, 1892 – June 18, 1966) was an American professional baseball player who pitched in the major leagues from 1917 until 1924. He played for the Philadelphia Athletics.

References

External links

1892 births
1966 deaths
Bartlett (minor league baseball) players
Baseball players from Texas
Fort Smith Twins players
Houston Buffaloes players
Hugo Hugoites players
Major League Baseball pitchers
McAlester Miners players
Mobile Bears players
New Haven Murlins players
Philadelphia Athletics players
Pueblo Braves players
Pueblo Steelworkers players
Toledo Mud Hens players
Toronto Maple Leafs (International League) players
Tulsa Oilers (baseball) players
Seattle Indians players
Wichita Falls Drillers players